= PTFC (disambiguation) =

PTFC or P.T.F.C. may refer to:

- Partick Thistle Football Club, in Glasgow, Scotland
- Portland Timbers Football Club, American soccer club in Portland, Oregon
- Portland Thorns Football Club
